The Color of Death is the seventh historical mystery novel about Sir John Fielding by Bruce Alexander (a pseudonym for Bruce Cook).

Plot summary
A string of daring and vicious robberies strike the great houses of central London.  Even Sir John is laid low, and young Jeremy Proctor must take a significant role in the investigation.

2001 American novels
Sir John Fielding series
Novels set in London
Historical mystery novels
G. P. Putnam's Sons books